Fausto Salsano (born 19 December 1962) is an Italian football manager and former player, who played as a midfielder. He most recently served as an assistant coach for the Italy national team.

Honours
Sampdoria
 Coppa Italia: 1984–85, 1987–88, 1988–89, 1993–94
 UEFA Cup Winners' Cup: 1989–90

Roma
 Coppa Italia: 1990–91

References

External links

1962 births
Living people
People from Cava de' Tirreni
Sportspeople from the Province of Salerno
Italian footballers
Footballers from Campania
Association football midfielders
Serie A players
Serie C players
U.C. Sampdoria players
Empoli F.C. players
Parma Calcio 1913 players
A.S. Roma players
Spezia Calcio players
F.S. Sestrese Calcio 1919 players
U.S. Imperia 1923 players
Association football coaches
Catania S.S.D. non-playing staff
ACF Fiorentina non-playing staff
Inter Milan non-playing staff
Manchester City F.C. non-playing staff
Italy national football team non-playing staff
U.S. Imperia 1923 managers
Italian expatriate sportspeople in England
Italian expatriate sportspeople in Russia
Italian expatriate sportspeople in Turkey
Galatasaray S.K. (football) non-playing staff